The 2022 NISA season is the fourth season of the National Independent Soccer Association's third-division soccer competition. After three years of split seasons, NISA switched to a full season format, with a single table and a playoff competition to determine the 2022 champion.

Teams
Six of the teams that participated in the 2021 Fall season returned, and were joined by four expansion clubs: Bay Cities FC, Flower City Union, Syracuse Pulse, and Valley United FC. From the existing 2021 teams, San Diego 1904 FC were rebranded to Albion San Diego, after merging with the youth club with the same name, while Chicago House AC, New Amsterdam FC and Stumptown AC will be on hiatus for 2022, and current title holders Detroit City FC moved to USL Championship.

Stadiums and locations

Personnel and sponsorship
''Note: The league has signed a deal with Hummel to be the official kit manufacturer, but it still allows clubs to find their own provider.

Coaching changes

Regular season
The season started on March 26, and will see each team play 26 games over 30 weeks: four times against each opponent in the same division and two times against each opponent in the opposite division.

Standings (March 26–August 27)

East Division

West Division

Standings (August 27–October 15)
Due to Bay Cities FC's withdrawal from this season, NISA has revised the 2022 schedule and table with the eight remaining clubs. As a result, this standings had been condensed into a single table format and used an average-points per game total (points earned divided by matches played).

Results

Playoffs
The playoffs began on October 21, and featured the top six teams from the regular season. The top two teams from the regular season table received a bye into the league semifinals. Teams finishing third through sixth played in the quarterfinals, with the winners being re-seeded before playing in the next round. The 2022 Final took place on November 6. All postseason games were broadcast online on Eleven Sports.

Originally, the East and West division winners would have been assigned the top two seeds and received byes to the semifinals. The second place teams in each division were to be seeded 3 and 4, while the third place finishers would be seeded 5 and 6. Following the restructuring of the table on August 27, the division aspect was dropped.

Schedule

Quarterfinals

Semifinals

NISA Championship Final

Player statistics

Top goalscorers

Top assists

Clean sheets

Awards

Individual awards

NISA Best XI

NISA Independent Cup
The NISA Independent Cup will start on June 25. It features nine of the ten NISA clubs, with California United Strikers FC opting not to participate the tournament. They will be joined by 27 invited amateur teams and divided geographically into nine regions of four clubs each. Each region will play a single round robin tournament between three amateur teams using a 10-point system. The winner of that round-robin will play against the NISA teams for the regional championship. Like last year, there will be no interregional play or national champion.

Participating Clubs
Nine NISA teams play in nine regions respectively, as California United Strikers FC did not participate. Midwest, New England and South Central region replaced with Empire, Northeast and SoCal region due to lack of NISA teams (despite Michigan Stars based from Midwest but plays in Great Lakes as NISA's 2022 season did not have Midwest based clubs other than Michigan Stars).

Empire Region

Group stage

Regional final

Great Lakes Region

Group stage

Regional final

Mid-Atlantic Region

Group stage

Regional final

Northeast Region

Group stage

Regional final

Pacific Region

Group stage

Regional final

SoCal Region

Group stage

Regional final

Southeast Region

Group stage

Regional final

Southwest Region

Group stage

Regional final

West Coast Region

Group stage

Regional final

Notes

See also 
 National Independent Soccer Association

References

External links 
 NISA official website

2022
2022 in American soccer leagues